Clatterbuck is a surname. Notable people with the surname include:

 Bobby Clatterbuck (1932–2004), American football player
 Nick Clatterbuck (born  1969), American juvenile convicted of murder
 Sarah Clatterbuck, American engineer

See also
 Clutterbuck